Brenda Murphy  (born 1958 or 1959) is a Canadian activist and politician, who is the 32nd lieutenant governor of New Brunswick, since September 8, 2019.

Murphy is the first openly LGBTQ person to hold any viceregal office in Canadian history.

Career 
She formerly served as a municipal councillor in Grand Bay–Westfield and served as the executive director of the Saint John Women's Empowerment Network in Saint John, best known for her advocacy on poverty and domestic violence issues. She served on a federal advisory council on poverty, and on New Brunswick's advisory council on the status of women.

Lieutenant-governor 
Since  September 8, 2019, she has served as lieutenant governor of New Brunswick. She is both the province's first openly LGBTQ lieutenant governor and the first openly LGBTQ person to hold any viceregal office in Canada.

In April 2022, the Court of Queen's Bench of New Brunswick ruled that her appointment as lieutenant governor violated the bilingual status of the province under the Charter of Rights and Freedoms, since Murphy is unilingual English-speaking.

Personal life 
Murphy is an out lesbian and lives in Grand Bay–Westfield. Her partner Linda Boyle has accompanied her on official engagements, including a visit to King Charles III at Buckingham Palace in November 2022.

References 

1950s births
Living people
Year of birth missing (living people)
21st-century Canadian politicians
21st-century Canadian women politicians
Canadian women viceroys
Canadian LGBT politicians
Canadian LGBT rights activists
Canadian women's rights activists
Canadian anti-poverty activists
Lesbian politicians
Lieutenant Governors of New Brunswick
New Brunswick municipal councillors
People from Kings County, New Brunswick
Women civil rights activists
Women in New Brunswick politics
21st-century Canadian LGBT people